Antone's was a record label based in Austin, Texas.

History

Antone's Records & Tapes was founded by Clifford Antone (October 27, 1949 – May 22, 2006) in 1987, and it was specialized in blues music, particularly blues artists who performed at his in 1975 opened blues nightclub Antone's in Austin, Texas. In 1987 Antone opened also a record store Antone's Record Shop in Austin, Texas. In 1993 the record label was renamed in a simplified manner as Antone's Records.
Antone's was awarded best local record label by The Austin Chronicle readers in 1993.

Texas Clef Entertainment Group, an affiliate of Antone's Records, acquired the assets of the defunct Watermelon Records label.

After Clifford Antone's death in 2006, the record label filed for bankruptcy. Masters of Antone's and Watermelon recordings went to New West as part of the Texas Music Group.

Artists

Here is a partial list of artists who have released recordings on the Antone’s label.
 Marcia Ball, Angela Strehli, and Lou Ann Barton
 Lou Ann Barton
 Zuzu Bollin
 Doyle Bramhall
 James Cotton
 Lewis Cowdrey
 Ronnie Earl
 Sue Foley
 Barry Goldberg
 Steve James
 Candye Kane
 Lazy Lester
 Barbara Lynn
 Pete Mayes
 Teddy Morgan
 Johnny Nicholas
 Omar & the Howlers
 Pinetop Perkins
 Toni Price
 Snooky Pryor
 Doug Sahm
 Silent Partners
 Angela Strehli
 Eddie Taylor
 Eddie Taylor, Memphis Slim, and Matt "Guitar" Murphy
 Luther Tucker
 Lavelle White
 Kim Wilson

See also 
 List of record labels

References

External links
 Clifford Antone's official site www.CliffordAntone.com
 Antone's Records & Tapes at Discogs
 Antone's Records at Discogs
 Antone's Night Club official site www.AntonesNightClub.com
 Antone's Record Shop official site www.AntonesRecordShop.com
  NewWestRecords.com

American record labels
American independent record labels
Music of Austin, Texas